Bouveret syndrome can refer to:

Bouveret-Hoffmann syndrome, or paroxysmal tachycardia
Bouveret's syndrome, or gastric outlet obstruction due to a gallstone